Papilio hesperus, the black and yellow swallowtail or Hesperus swallowtail, is a butterfly of the family Papilionidae. It is found in Africa.

The larvae feed on Beilschmiedia species, including Beilschmiedia ugandensis.

Taxonomy
Papilio hesperus is the nominal member of the hesperus species group. The members of the clade are:
Papilio hesperus Westwood, 1843
Papilio euphranor Trimen, 1868
Papilio horribilis Butler, 1874
Papilio pelodurus Butler, 1896

Subspecies
Papilio hesperus hesperus (Nigeria, Cameroon, Equatorial Guinea, Congo, Congo Republic, Uganda, north-western Tanzania, northern Zambia)
Papilio hesperus feae Storace, 1963  Equatorial Guinea)
Papilio hesperus sudana Gabriel, 1945  (southern Sudan)

Habitats
Congolian forests and surrounding ecoregions.

Biogeographic realm
Afrotropical realm.

References

Carcasson, R.H., 1960 "The Swallowtail Butterflies of East Africa (Lepidoptera, Papilionidae)". Journal of the East Africa Natural History Society pdf Key to East Africa members of the Papilionidae, diagnostic and other notes and figures. (Permission to host granted by The East Africa Natural History Society

External links

Butterflies described in 1843
hesperus